Grifolin is an isolate of the mushroom Albatrellus confluens which upregulates DAPK1 in vitro.

References

Phenols